Santa Fe (Spanish; 'holy faith') or Santa Fé (Portuguese; 'holy faith') may refer to:

Places

Argentina
Santa Fe, Argentina
Santa Fe Province

Bolivia
Santa Fe de Yapacaní
Santa Fe (Oruro)

Brazil
Bonito de Santa Fé
Santa Fé de Goiás
Santa Fé de Minas
Santa Fé do Araguaia
Santa Fé do Sul
Santa Fé, Paraná

Chile
Santa Fe (fort), near the island of Diego Diaz

Colombia
Santa Fe, Bogotá
Santa Fe de Antioquia
Santa Fe de Ralito

Cuba
Santa Fe, Havana
Santa Fe, Isle of Youth

Ecuador
Santa Fe Island, one of the Galápagos Islands

Honduras
Santa Fe, Colón
Santa Fe, Ocotepeque

Mexico
Santa Fe, Mexico City
Santa Fe de la Laguna

Panama
Santa Fe, Darién
Santa Fe District
Santa Fe, Veraguas

Philippines
Santa Fe, Cebu
Santa Fe, Leyte
Santa Fe, Nueva Vizcaya
Santa Fe, Romblon

Spain
Santa Fe de Mondújar
Santa Fe del Penedès
Santa Fe, Granada

United States
 , a former province of New Spain and territory of Mexico (1598–1848)
Santa Fe, New Mexico, state capital city
Santa Fe County, New Mexico
Santa Fe River (New Mexico)
Rancho Santa Fe, California
Santa Fe, Oakland, California
Santa Fe Springs, California
Lake Santa Fe, Alachua County, Florida
Santa Fe River (Florida)
Santa Fe Township, Clinton County, Illinois
New Santa Fe, Indiana
Santa Fe, Miami County, Indiana
Santa Fe, Spencer County, Indiana
Santa Fe, Missouri
Santa Fe, Ohio
Santa Fe, Oklahoma
Santa Fe, Tennessee
Santa Fe, Texas

Arts and entertainment

Music 
 Santa Fe (group), a musical trio 
 "Santa Fe" (Bellamy Brothers song), a 1988 single by The Bellamy Brothers
 "Santa-Fe" (Bob Dylan song), a 1967 song by Bob Dylan
 "Santa Fe", a song from the 1990 Jon Bon Jovi album Blaze of Glory
 "Santa Fe", a song from the 2011 album The Rip Tide by Beirut
 "Santa Fe", a song from the musical Newsies
 "Santa Fe", a song from the musical Rent

Other uses in arts and entertainment
 Santa Fe (film), a 1951 Western starring Randolph Scott
 Santa Fe (1997 film), a 1997 film starring Gary Cole
 Santa Fe (Kishin Shinoyama book), a 1991 photo book

Sports
 CD Santa Fe, a Spanish football club
 Colón de Santa Fe, an Argentine football club
 Independiente Santa Fe, a Colombian football club
 Unión de Santa Fe, an Argentine football club

Transportation
 Hyundai Santa Fe, a sport utility vehicle

Ships
 , the name of several ships of the Argentine navy
 , a German cargo ship sunk in the Black Sea in 1943
 , A Chilean-owned Liberty ship that disappeared in 1967
 , the name of two US Navy ships

Railway
 Atchison, Topeka and Santa Fe Railway, often known as just Santa Fe, US
 Chili Line, or Santa Fe Branch, US (1880s–1941)
 Santa Fe Southern Railway, US (1992–2014) 
 2-10-2, the "Santa Fe" type wheel arrangement

People
 Gerónimo de Santa Fe (fl. 1400–1430), Spanish Christian convert, physician and writer
 Saint Faith, French 3rd century saint

Other uses
 Disney's Hotel Santa Fe, a hotel at Disneyland Resort Paris
 Santa Fe Abbey, a former monastery in Zaragoza, Spain
 Santa Fe College, in Florida, U.S.
 Santa Fe Community College, in New Mexico, U.S.

See also

Sainte-Foy (disambiguation)
Santa Fe High School (disambiguation)
Santa Fe Depot (disambiguation)
Santa Fe Station (disambiguation)
Santa Fe Trail (disambiguation)
Santa Fe Independent School District v. Doe, a U.S. Supreme Court case about school prayer